Ernst Krause may refer to:

Ernst Krause (biologist) (1839–1903), German biologist
Ernst Krause (entomologist) (1899–1987), German entomologist
Ernst Krause (musicologist) (1911–1997), German musicologist
Ernst Henry Krause (1913–1989), American physicist

See also
Ernst Kraus (1863–1941), German tenor